Skagit Regional Health is a health care system based in northwestern Washington state.

History

Skagit Regional Health was formed on July 1, 2010, by a merger of the Skagit Valley Hospital and Skagit Valley Medical Center.

On June 1, 2016, Skagit Regional Health signed a 30-year lease with Arlington-based Cascade Valley Hospital to take over operations and effectively merge the two systems.

Facilities

Cascade Valley Hospital, Arlington
Skagit Valley Hospital, Mount Vernon

References

External links

Healthcare in Washington (state)
Hospital networks in the United States
Medical and health organizations based in Washington (state)